Jacqui Bonita Day (born 6 May 1992) is a field hockey player from Australia.

Personal life
Jacqui Day was born in Mountain Creek, Queensland, and grew up in the Sunshine Coast.

Career

State level

Juniors
Throughout her junior career Jacqui Day represented her home state, Queensland, in national tournaments. In 2013, she culminated her junior career at the Under–21 Australian Championships in Darwin, and was adjudged Player of the Tournament. 

Following her performance at the 2013 national championships, Day was named in a 25–player squad for the Junior World Cup, however did not make the final 18–player team.

Australian Hockey League
From 2013 until 2015, Jacqui Day played for the Queensland Scorchers in the Australian Hockey League.

In 2016, Day made the decision to represent the WA Diamonds, following a successful year in the Hockey WA Premier League Competition.

National team
Jacqui Day made her senior international debut for the Hockeyroos in 2016, during a test match against China in Perth.

Following her 2016 debut, Day was named in the Australian squad for the 2017 calendar year. Her last performance for the team came in November 2017 in a test series against Japan in Adelaide.

References

External links
 
 

1992 births
Living people
Australian female field hockey players
21st-century Australian women